Bathurst is a surname of Old English origin. It is a locational surname, referring to those from Bathurst manor, near Battle Abbey, Sussex.

Notables with this name include
 Allen Bathurst, 1st Earl Bathurst (1684–1775), politician
 Allen Bathurst, 6th Earl Bathurst (1832–1892)
 Allen Bathurst, 9th Earl Bathurst (born 1961)
 Allen Bathurst, Lord Apsley (1895–1942), British Army officer
 Benjamin Bathurst (disambiguation), many people
 Charles Bathurst, 1st Viscount Bledisloe, (1867–1958) agriculturist and politician
 Charles Bathurst (1754–1831), better known as Charles Bragge Bathurst, a British politician
 Christopher Bathurst, 3rd Viscount Bledisloe (1934–2009)
 Earl Bathurst
 Elizabeth Bathurst (1655–1685), English Quaker preacher and theologian
 Henry Bathurst, 2nd Earl Bathurst (1714–1794), lord chancellor
 Henry Bathurst, 3rd Earl Bathurst (1762–1834), secretary for war & colonies
 Henry Bathurst, 4th Earl Bathurst (1790–1866), MP
 Henry Bathurst, 8th Earl Bathurst (1927–2011)
 Henry Bathurst (bishop) (1744–1837)
 John Bathurst (1607–1659), physician
 Peter Bathurst (1687–1748), member of parliament for Wilton, for Cirencester, and for Salisbury
 Peter Bathurst (1723–1801), member of parliament for Eye
 Ralph Bathurst (1620–1704)
 Richard Bathurst (1722/3–1762), physician and writer 
 Robert Bathurst (born 1957), actor
 Seymour Bathurst, 7th Earl Bathurst (1864–1923)
 Walter Bathurst (1764–1827), naval officer
 William Bathurst, 5th Earl Bathurst (1791–1878)
 William Hiley Bathurst (1796–1877), clergyman

See also
 Reginald Bathurst Birch (1856–1943)

References

English toponymic surnames